Wayne Gardner Racing was an Australian motor racing team that competed in the Australian Touring Car Championship from 1994 until 1999.

History

Formation
The team was created to further the motor sport career of 1987 World Motorcycle Champion, Wayne Gardner who retired from motor cycle racing at the end of the 1992 season. After racing with the Holden Racing Team in 1993, a falling out with team owner Tom Walkinshaw saw Gardner leave the team at season's end. In late 1993 Gardner purchased Bob Forbes Racing that had competed in the 1993 season with one VP Commodore driven by Neil Crompton. Initially operating out of Bob Forbes' Mona Vale premises the team relocated to Wetherill Park. Former Gibson Motorsport manager Alan Heaphy was appointed team manager. The team had backing from Coca-Cola, Holden and Dunlop.

1994
The team debuted at round 1 of the 1994 championship with a second VP Commodore built to complement Neil Crompton's 1993 car. Gardner and Crompton's combined in the former's #4 car for the endurance races while Win Percy and Russell Ingall raced #7, finishing fifth at the Bathurst 1000.

1995
Aside from upgrading its cars to VR specifications the team carries on unchanged in 1995. Brad Jones joined Percy in the #4 car for the endurance races with Gardner and Crompton sharing #7, finishing fifth and third at the Bathurst 1000.

1996
The team continued unchanged into 1996. Brad Jones filled in for an unavailable Gardner at the Indy support race before Crompton's car was benched due to budget constraints. Jones was joined by Tony Scott for the endurance races in #4 while Gardner and Crompton debuted a new car as #7 finishing 4th at the Bathurst 1000.

1997
For 1997 the team switched to Yokohama tyres and upgraded to VS specifications. Again only running one car now as #7, Gardner won the team's only round at the opening round at Calder Park. Crompton returned for the endurance races with Gardner leading at the Bathurst 1000 when the engine expired on lap 90. A second car was entered as a customer car for Peter Bradbury, Paul Stokell and Anthony Tratt as #54. At the end of 1997 Gardner decided to close down the team.

1998
Gardner retained one VS and with Melbourne based Paris Acott overseeing preparation, ran at selected high-profile events races in 1998 as #96 teaming with Paul Stokell for the endurance races.

1999
For 1999 Gardner purchased a Perkins Engineering customer Commodore VT and again entered select high-profile events as #19 with David Brabham co-driving at the Bathurst 1000. By 1999 Gardner was competing full-time in Japanese GT racing driving factory-supported Toyota Supras and at the end of the year sold the car and only appeared in Australia as a hired driver.

Road cars
At the peak of the team's ability Gardner branched out into street car performance tuning, creating a set of bodykit and engine tune modifications for Commodore VR and VSs under the WGR Group A brand. It was to be short-lived with few cars sold.

Drivers
Other than Wayne Gardner, those who drove for WGR include (in order of appearance):

  Neil Crompton
  Win Percy
  Russell Ingall
  Brad Jones
  Tony Scott
  Paul Stokell
  Peter Bradbury
  Anthony Tratt
  David Brabham

References

Australian auto racing teams
Auto parts suppliers of Australia
Sports teams in Sydney
Supercars Championship teams
1999 disestablishments in Australia
1993 establishments in Australia
Auto racing teams established in 1993
Auto racing teams disestablished in 1999